Dindayalpur is a village situated in Varanasi district of Uttar Pradesh state, India.

Financial and public institutions
Punjab National Bank , Bank of Baroda , state bank , icici , Axis bank , Allahabad bank , union bank , central bank , HDFC Bank has a branch situated in Dindayalpur.

References 

Varanasi district